Under a Killing Moon may refer to:

 Under a Killing Moon, the third installment in the Tex Murphy series of adventure games
 Under a Killing Moon (song), a song by Thrice from The Artist in the Ambulance